Cold Brook Dam is an earthen dam located near Hot Springs, South Dakota in Fall River County in the southwestern part of the state, in the southern Black Hills.

The earthen dam was constructed in 1953 by the United States Army Corps of Engineers with a height of 127 feet and a length at its crest of 925 feet.  It impounds Cold Brook Creek, a tributary of the Cheyenne River for flood control purposes during flash flood events for nearby Hot Springs.  The dam is owned and operated by the Corps of Engineers, Omaha District.

The reservoir it creates, Cold Brook Lake, has a water surface of 36 acres and has a maximum capacity of 7200 acre-feet.  year-round recreation is possible and includes canoeing, fishing, swimming, wildlife viewing, camping, and (in the winter) ice fishing, skating, and cross-country skiing. Cold Brook Lake Recreation Area includes a boat ramp, picnic area, swim beach and campground is managed by the Corps of Engineers.

Cottonwood Springs Dam, another Corps of Engineers dam is located about 5 miles to the southwest.

External links
Cold Brook Lake at Recreation.gov
U.S. Army Corps of Engineers, Cold Brook Dam

References 

Dams in South Dakota
Reservoirs in South Dakota
United States Army Corps of Engineers dams
Buildings and structures in Fall River County, South Dakota
Dams completed in 1953
Bodies of water of Fall River County, South Dakota
1953 establishments in South Dakota